Jamai Raja is an Indian Bengali-language television Comedy soap opera that  premiered on 5 June 2017, and  airs on Bengali Zee Bangla. The show  stars Arjun Chakrabarty and Shreema Bhattacharjee in lead roles, and Chaiti Ghoshal as the main antagonist.

Cast

Main cast
Arjun Chakrabarty as Ishan Chatterjee
Shreema Bhattacharjee as Nilasha Banerjee
Chaiti Ghoshal as Basabdatta Banerjee aka BB
Geetashree Roy as IPS Damini Sen

Recurring 
Bharat Kaul as Ishan's father
Moyna Mukherjee as Ishan's mother
Alokananda Roy as Nilasha's grandmother 
Sumit Samaddar as Nilasha's uncle
Sayantani Sengupta as Nilasha's aunt
Uday Pratap Singh as Abhishek 
Prriyam Chakraborty as Megha
Riyanka Dasgupta as Preeti
Manali Dey as Paromita
Aditya Roy as Alokesh
Kaushik Banerjee as Alokesh's father
Mou Bhattacharya as Alokesh's mother
Elfina Mukherjee as Alokesh's sister
Prapti Chatterjee as Antara
Shiddharta Banerjee as Indroneel
Kaushambi Chakrabarty as Mohini
Lovely Maitra as Riya
Raj Bhattacharya as Raj
Debolina Dutta as Purba dutta
Solanki Roy as Tania Sen

References

External links
 Official Website at ZEE5

2017 Indian television series debuts
2018 Indian television series endings
Zee Bangla original programming